She's a Julie (foaled  April 27, 2015 in Kentucky) is an American Thoroughbred racehorse and the winner of the 2019 La Troienne Stakes.

Career

She's a Julie's first race was on May 26th, 2017, at Churchill Downs, where she came in first. 

Her next win did not come until June 2rd, 2018, when she won at Churchill Downs.

She then won the Iowa Oaks on July 5th, 2018, and placed 2nd the month after in the 2018 Alabama Stakes.

She started off the 2019 season by winning the Bayakoa Handicap and then on May 3rd, 2019, she captured the 2019 La Troienne Stakes.

Pedigree

References

2015 racehorse births
American racehorses
racehorses trained in the United States
racehorses bred in Kentucky
Thoroughbred family 1-n